Luc Ayang (born 1947) is a Cameroonian politician who served as 3rd Prime Minister of Cameroon from 1983 to 1984. He has been President of the Economic and Social Council of Cameroon since 1984.

Biography
An ethnic Kirdi and a Christian, Ayang was born at Doukoula, located in the Karhay District of Mayo-Danay Department in the Far North Province. He graduated from the University of Yaounde with a degree in law and economics in 1972. In March 1975, he was appointed to a post in the Secretariat-General of the Presidency, as Head of the Service of Legislation and Regulation in the Division of Administrative and Legal Affairs. He was then named First Deputy Prefect of Ngaoundéré in September 1976, before entering the government as Minister of Livestock, Fisheries and Animal Industries on 2 May 1978. After five years in that position, he became Prime Minister of Cameroon, on an interim basis, under President Paul Biya, serving from 22 August 1983 to 25 January 1984, when the post of Prime Minister was eliminated through a constitutional amendment.

Since 1984, Ayang has been the President of the Economic and Social Council.  He is also a member of the Political Bureau of the ruling Cameroon People's Democratic Movement (CPDM). During the campaign for the 2004 presidential election, Ayang was a vice-president of the support and follow-up committee of Biya's election campaign in the Far North Province. Later, during the campaign for the July 2007 parliamentary and municipal elections, Ayang was a member of the CPDM's Central Campaign Committee; he was also President of the CPDM Provincial Campaign Committee in the Far North Province.

In June 2013 he delivered a message from President Biya to Angolan President José Eduardo dos Santos seeking a general increase in cooperation between the two countries.

Personal life
He is married with three children.

References

1947 births
Living people
People from Far North Region (Cameroon)
Cameroonian Christians
Cameroon People's Democratic Movement politicians
Prime Ministers of Cameroon
Fisheries ministers of Cameroon